Polar X-plorer is a steel roller coaster at Legoland Billund in Billund, Denmark. It opened on 29 April 2012 as Zierer's first coaster with a freefall drop track section.

History
On 11 October 2011, Legoland Billund announced that the park would open "Polar Land", a new area for the park. It features live penguins and a new restaurant.

Ride experience
After cresting the chain lift hill, riders go through a few twists and turns before entering an indoor section, where a scene of LEGO minifigures chipping away at an ice wall with picks can be seen. Suddenly, the floor beneath the minifigures gives way and the train vertically free-falls  before exiting the indoor portion and going through more twists and turns before going back to the station. The ride vehicles are themed as snow mobiles.

See also
 2012 in amusement parks
 Verbolten
 Th13teen

References

External links
 

Roller coasters in Denmark